This is a list of research institutes in Greece.


State-run institutes 
 "Athena" Research and Innovation Center in ICT and Knowledge Technologies (formerly KETEP/IRIS)
 Industrial Systems Institute (INBIS/ISI)
 Institute for Language and Speech Processing (ILSP)
 Information Management Systems Institute (IMSI - formerly known as Institute for the Management of Information Systems IMIS)
 Hellenic Technology Clusters Initiative "Corallia"
 Academy of Athens
 Foundation for Biomedical Research of the Academy of Athens
 Research Centre for Modern Greek Dialects
 Hellenic Folklore Research Centre
 Center of Research for Medieval and Modern Hellenism
 Research Center for the History of Greek Law
 Center of Research into the History of Modern Hellenism
 Research Center for Greek and Latin Literature
 Research Centre for Greek Philosophy
 Research Centre for Atmospheric Physics and Climatology
 Research Center for Antiquity
 Center of Research into Greek Society
 Research Centre for Byzantine and Post-Byzantine Art
 Research Center for Scientific Terms and Neologisms
 Research Center for Astronomy and Applied Mathematics
 Research Center of Pure and Applied Mathematics
 Biomedical Sciences Research Center (BSRC) "Alexander Fleming"
 Center for European Constitutional Law (CECL)
 Center for the Greek Language
 Center of International & European Economic Law (CIEEL)
 Centre of Planning and Economic Research (KEPE)
 Center for Research and Technology Hellas (CERTH)
 Chemical Process & Energy Resources Institute (CPERI)
 Hellenic Institute of Transport (HIT)
 Information Technologies Institute (ITI)
 Institute for Solid Fuels Technology and Applications (ISFTA)
 Institute of Applied Biosciences (INAB)
 Institute for Research & Technology of Thessaly (IRETETH)
 Center for Renewable Energy Sources (CRES)
 Centre for Plasma Physics and Lasers, T.E.I. of Crete
 Centre for Technological Research of Crete (CTR-C)
 Computer Technology Institute and Press "Diophantus"
 Education Research Centre
 Eugenides Foundation
 Exports' Research and Studies Institute (IEES)
 Institute of Optics and Vision (IVO)
 National Agricultural Research Foundation (NAGREF)
 National Engineering Research Institute of Greece (NERIG)
 Animal Research Institute
 Institute of Viticulture, Vegetable crops and Floriculture of Heraklion
 Institute of Agricultural Machinery and Constructions
 Forest Research Institute
 Veterinary Research Institute
 Hellenic Institute of Apiculture
 Cereal Institute
 Institute of Mediterranean Forest Ecosystems & Forest Products Technology
 Institute of Subtropical Plants and Olive Tree of Chania
 National Hellenic Research Foundation (EIE) - Athens
 Foundation for Economic and Industrial Research (IOBE)
 Foundation for Research & Technology - Hellas (FORTH)
 Institute of Applied Computational Mathematics (IACM)
Institute of Astrophysics (IA)
 Institute of Chemical Engineering & High Temperature Processes (ICE/HT)
 Institute of Computer Science (ICS)
 Institute of Electronic Structure and Laser (IESL)
 Institute of Mediterranean Studies (IMS)
 Institute of Molecular Biology & Biotechnology (IMBB)
Biomedical Research Division (BRD)
Institute of Petroleum Research
 Hellenic Geological Institute
 Hellenic Institute of International & Foreign Law
 Hellenic Centre for Marine Research (NCMR)
 Institute of Oceanography
 Institute of Aquaculture
 Institute of Marine Biological Resources
 Institute of Inland Waters
 Institute of Marine Biology and Genetics
 Hellenic Institute for Occupational Health and Safety (ELINYAE)
 Hellenic Pasteur Institute - Athens
 Institute of Biomedical Technology (INBIT)
 Institute of Geology and Mineral Exploration
 Institute of International Relations (IIR)
 Institute for International Economic Relations (IIER)
 Mediterranean Agronomic Institute of Chania
 National Center for Social Research (EKKE)
 National Observatory of Athens
Institute for Astronomy, Astrophysics, Space Applications and Remote Sensing
 Institute of Geodynamics
 Institute for Environmental research and Sustainable Development
  National Centre of Scientific Research "Demokritos" - Athens
 Institute of Informatics and Telecommunications
 Institute of Biosciences and Applications
 Institute of Nuclear and Radiological Sciences, Energy, Technology and Safety
 Institute of Advanced Materials, Physicochemical Processes, Nanotechnology & Microsystems
 Institute of Nuclear and Particle Physics
 National School of Public Health
 Research Centre for Equal Opportunities (KETHI)
 Society for Social and Economic Studies (EKOME)
 Space Internetworking Center (SPICE)
 Telecommunication Systems Institute
 University Research Institute of Social Insurance, Health & Assistance (EPIKAYP)

Private institutes 
 Alfa Institute of Biomedical Sciences (AIBS) www.aibs.gr
 The American College of Greece Research Center (ACG-RC) 
 American School of Classical Studies at Athens (ASCSA) ascsa.edu.gr
 Athens Information Technology (AIT)
 Center for International Strategic Analyses (KEDISA)
 Cognitive Systems Research Institute (CSRI) csri.gr

See also
 Open access in Greece to scholarly communication

References

Research institutes